Park Han-byul, (born November 17, 1984) is a South Korean actress and model.

Career 
As a student at Anyang Art High School, Park posted photographs of herself on the internet, becoming an online celebrity due to her close physical resemblance to actress Jun Ji-hyun. After being signed by an entertainment agency, she made her acting debut in the 2003 horror film Wishing Stairs, her part requiring her to learn ballet over a two-month period of rigorous training.

Having since appeared in a succession of television drama series, Park returned to the big screen with a role in the 2008 film Fate. She then went on to star in the horror film Yoga later the same year. In 2010, Park starred in the coming-of-age film My Black Mini Dress, based on the same titled chick lit novel by Kim Min-seo.

In July 2012, Park co-starred with Kim Ji-seok in horror film Two Moons, playing the role of So-hee, a horror fiction novelist with a hidden secret. Park then starred in another horror film Bunshinsaba 2 directed by Ahn Byeong-ki, marking her acting debut in China.

Park returned to TV, starring in the daily drama One Well-Raised Daughter. In 2015, she starred in the melodrama I Have a Lover, where she attracted attention with her portrayal of a morally ambiguous woman. In 2017, she took on the titular role in MBC's variety drama Borg Mom.

In 2019, Park is set to star in the romance melodrama Love in Sadness, a remake of the 1999 TBS drama Beautiful Person.

Personal life
In June 2009, K-pop singer Seven acknowledged on his website that he and Park had been in a relationship for seven years, with the couple having first met when they were seniors in high school. Seven had previously denied rumors that they were a couple in order to protect Park's privacy and let the relationship grow naturally.  On December 23, 2014, a statement was released by Park's agency stating that she and Seven had ended their 12-year relationship earlier on in the year.

On November 24, 2017, it was announced that Park had married a non-celebrity earlier that year, and that they planned to have the ceremony in 2018 with family and friends. The couple had met three years prior and entered into a relationship sometime in the beginning of 2017. It was also announced that Park was 15 weeks pregnant. On April 30, 2018, it was reported that Park had given birth to a son. On May 31, 2022, the agency announced that Park is pregnant with a second child. On August 17, 2022, it was announced that Park had given birth to a second child.

Filmography

Television series

Film

Variety show

Awards and nominations

References

External links 
 
 
 
 
 Star Focus: Park Han-byul at Arirang

South Korean film actresses
South Korean television actresses
South Korean female models
Konkuk University alumni
Actresses from Seoul
1984 births
Living people
21st-century South Korean actresses